Jan Richard Andersson (born 5 December 1970) is a Swedish politician of the Moderate Party. He became a member of the Riksdag in 2006 for the constituency of Kalmar. He is currently taking up seat number 12 in the Riksdag.

Career
Andersson has studied media and communication science as well as sociology and has previously worked as a political secretary in Kalmar. He is a member of the Defense Committee and an alternate for the EU-committee, from 2006 to 2010 he served in the Civil Committee, from 2006 to 2011 he was a member of the Social Committee, and from 2001 to 2014 he was a member of the Justice Committee. Andersson has also been the Moderate Party's spokesperson for Alcohol and Tobacco questions.

As a member of the Social Committee, Andersson expressed himself negatively towards Sweden's needle and syringe programmes and chose to advocate for addicts to use inhalation of drugs such as heroin instead of needles to minimize the infection rate of needle-transmitted diseases. Andersson is also a member of Kalmar's municipal council. He resides in Kalmar.

References

1970 births
Living people
Members of the Riksdag from the Moderate Party